The personal pronouns and possessives in Modern Standard Hindi of the Hindustani language display a higher degree of inflection than other parts of speech. Personal pronouns have distinct forms according to whether they stand for a subject (nominative), a direct object (accusative), an indirect object (dative), or a reflexive object. Pronouns further have special forms used with postpositions.

The possessive pronouns are the same as the possessive adjectives, but each is inflected to express the grammatical person of the possessor and the grammatical gender of the possessed.

Pronoun use displays considerable variation with register and dialect, with particularly pronoun preference differences between the most colloquial varieties of Hindi.

Postpositions 
The function of case marking in Hindi is done exclusively by postpositions. The pronouns of Hindi can be declined into three cases, nominative, oblique (and ergative), and dative/accusative. The oblique and ergative case is used with the case marking postpositions to form the ergative, accusative/dative, instrumental/dative, genitive, inessive, adessive, terminative, and semblative cases. The postpositions are considered to be bound morphemes to the pronouns. The eight primary postpositions of Hindi are mention in the table below:

Note:

 The pronoun इस (is) which is the oblique case of the nominative demonstrative pronoun यह (yah) can be translated as he, she, it, and this.
 The postpositions which end in the vowel ा (-ā) (which are the genitive and semblative postpositions) can further decline according to gender, number, and grammatical case of the noun it describes. The declension of postpositions follow the following declension by changing their end vowels:

Personal pronouns 
Hindi has personal pronouns in the first and second person, but not the third person, where demonstratives are used instead. They are inflected for case and number (singular, and plural), but not for gender. Pronouns decline for four grammatical cases in Hindi: The nominative case, the accusative/dative case and two postpositional cases, the oblique and ergative cases. The second person pronouns have three levels of formality: intimate, familiar, and formal. As also done in many other Indo-European languages, the plural pronouns are used as singular polite or formal pronouns.

Note:

 In the eastern dialects of Hindi, the pronoun हम  is used as both the first person singular and plural pronoun. When plurality is to be implied then words such as लोग  (people), सब  (all) are added after the pronoun.
 True genitive pronouns exist for the personal pronouns (except आप ) and they cannot be constructed from the oblique cases, they are discussed in the 'Possessive Pronouns' section below.
The emphasised oblique case for the pronoun आप (āp) is constructed periphrastically using the exclusive emphatic particle ही (hī) which is आप ही (āp hī). Although pronounced the same as आफी (āphī), it is never written like that.

Demonstrative, interrogative, and relative pronouns 
Just like Sanskrit, Hindi does not have true third person pronouns, but its demonstratives play their role when they stand independently of a substantive. The demonstrative pronouns just like the personal pronouns can be declined into the nominative, ergative, accusative/dative and the oblique case.

The relative and the interrogative pronouns can be constructed for the non-nominative cases by just changing the first consonant of the demonstrative pronouns to ज (j) and क (k) respectively.

Notes:

 The ergative case is predominantly used with animate nouns.
 कौन  is the animate interrogative and क्या  is the inanimate interrogative.
 जो is used as both the animate and inanimate relative pronoun.
 The genitive and semblative postpositions decline to agree with the number, gender, and case of the object it possesses or describes respectively.

Possessive pronouns 
The possessive pronouns are the same as the possessive adjectives, but each is inflected to express the grammatical person of the possessor and the grammatical gender of the possessed. Unlike the personal pronouns (except for आप), there are no true possessive pronoun forms for the demonstrative pronouns. So, the demonstrative, interrogative, and relative possessive pronouns are formed using oblique case with the postposition का (kā).

 The possessive pronouns and the genitive postposition का (kā) decline to agree with the number, gender, and case of the possessed object. 
 In colloquial usage जो (jo) functions as both animate and inanimate relative pronoun. सो (so) (inanimate relative pronoun) also sometimes used but in a limited manner.

Reflexive pronouns 
There are a number of words in Hindi that function as reflexive pronouns. The indeclinable स्वयं  (svayam) can indicate reflexivity pertaining to subjects of any person or number, and—since subjects in Hindi can appear in the nominative, or dative cases—it can have the sense of any of these two cases.

 ख़ुद (khud) and स्वयं (svayam) are indeclinable reflexive pronouns.
 अपना (apnā) is a declinable reflexive pronoun.

Indefinite pronouns 
There are two indefinite pronouns in Hindi: कोई  (someone, somebody) and कुछ  (something). कुछ  is also used as an adjective (numeral and quantitative) and as an adverb meaning ‘some, a few, a little, partly.’ Similarly, कोई  can be used as an adverb in the sense of ‘some, about.’ When it is used with the semblative postposition सा   the pronoun कोई सा  (of some kind, some, something) is formed. The indefinite pronouns of Hindi are mentioned in the table below:

Note: The animate plural forms are also used as formal animate singular forms.

Adverbial pronouns 
Adverbial pronouns of Hindi and the declension pattern of the declinable pronouns are mentioned in the table below:

References

Bibliography
 
 

Hindi languages
Hindi
Pronouns